Ala'a Abu Saleh (born June 25, 1987) is a Palestinian footballer who plays as a right full back.

References

1987 births
Living people
Arab citizens of Israel
Arab-Israeli footballers
Israeli footballers
Palestinian footballers
Bnei Sakhnin F.C. players
Shabab Al-Khalil SC players
Hapoel Iksal F.C. players
Israeli Premier League players
Liga Leumit players
West Bank Premier League players
Palestine international footballers
Footballers from Sakhnin
Palestinian people of Israeli descent
Association football defenders